The Moto 360 is an Android Wear-based smartwatch announced by Motorola Mobility in 2014. It was announced on March 18, 2014  and was released on September 5, 2014 in the US along with new models of the Moto X and the Moto G.

Hardware and design
The Moto 360's form factor is based on the circular design of traditional watches, supporting a 40mm (1.5 in) viewing diameter and circular capacitive touch display. The case is stainless steel and available in different finishes. Removable wrist bands are available in metal and natural leather. The watch is water resistant and has only a single physical button.

The watch has an all day battery, and rather than needing to be plugged in, it charges wirelessly by being placed on an included cradle. Internally  it has dual microphones for voice recognition and noise rejection and a vibration motor allowing tactile feedback. An ambient light sensor optimizes screen brightness and allows gesture controls such as blanking the screen by placing one's hand over it. Bluetooth 4.0 is included for connectivity and driving wireless headphones. In the June 2015 release notes, Motorola announced Wi-Fi support for the device, such that it could be used out of Bluetooth range. A heart-rate sensor and 9-axis accelerometer support health and activity monitoring. It has IP67 certification for dust resistance and fresh water resistance rated at 30-minutes at 1.5 meters (4.9 feet) depth.

Software
The Moto 360 runs Android Wear, Google's Android-based platform specifically designed for wearable devices. The 360 currently runs Android Marshmallow and pairs with any phone running Android 4.3 or higher and any iPhone running IOS 8 or higher. Its software displays notifications from paired phones. It uses paired phones to enable interactive features such as Google Now cards, search, navigation, playing music, and integration with apps such as fitness, EverNote, and others.

Reception
Ars Technica criticized the "terrible" battery life and performance, blaming it on the outdated SoC (system-on-chip) used in the Moto 360: "Motorola inexplicably chose an ancient 1GHz single-core Texas Instruments OMAP 3". In a review for Engadget, Jon Fingas wrote, "The interface isn't that great at surfacing the information I need at the time I need it, for that matter. Spotify's Android Wear card always showed up on cue, but Sonos' controls appeared inconsistently even when there was music playing. And the watch frequently defaulted to showing apps that weren't really relevant to the situation at hand; no, I don't need to check out my fitness goals in the middle of the workday. Google may be right that watches are primarily about receiving passive streams of information, but that doesn't excuse doing a poor job when I want to be more active." He concluded, "Even with those quirks in mind, it's pretty clear the Moto 360 has turned a corner in half a year's time. It's no longer the underdeveloped novelty that it was on launch, and it's now my pick of the current Android Wear crop. True, it doesn't have the G Watch R's true circular display, the ZenWatch's custom software or the Sony Smartwatch 3's GPS, but I'd say of the three, it strikes the best balance between looks, functionality and price."

See also
 Motoactv
 Wearable computer
 Microsoft Band
 Apple Watch
 Pebble

References

External links

Android (operating system) devices
Products introduced in 2014
Wear OS devices
Smartwatches